Stillingia zelayensis is a species of flowering plant in the family Euphorbiaceae. It was originally described as Sapium zelayense Kunth in 1817. It is native to Central America.

References

zelayensis
Plants described in 1817
Flora of Central America